Punorjonmo is a Bangladeshi fictional universe and series of TV special created by Vicky Zahed. The universe includes television specials and web films. The universe was established by crossing over common plot elements, settings, cast, and characters.

Development
In July 2021, a television special called Punorjonmo by Vicky Zahid became popular after it was aired on Channel i. Later its sequel Punorjonmo 2 was produced. A web film named Shuklopokkho was made soon after which connected the story of Punorjonmo series. In September 2022, Vicky Zahid told the Bangla Tribune about his plan to create the "Punorjonmo Universe". He said that characters from Shuklopokkho and Punorjonmo series will be seen in Punorjonmo 3. Punorjonmo 3 released on 1st October, 2022. Director Vicky Zahed told Prothom Alo on 27 October 2022 that Punorjonmo 4, the last sequel, will probably come on Eid-ul-Fitr 2023.

Television specials

Punorjonmo 1
After the airing of the first part, the audience demanded its sequel.

Punorjonmo 2
After the popularity of Punorjonmo 1, Channel i aired its sequel on 1 October 2021. Apart from the characters of the previous special, Shahed Ali acted in this sequel. The sequel received over 2 million views on YouTube between October 1–4. It is known that Vicky Zahid spent one and a half months writing the story of the sequel.

Punorjonmo 3
While filming Punorjonmo 2, Vicky Zahid wanted to make Punorjonmo 3. So when the second sequel became popular after airing, he discussed with the crew and actors and announced the next sequel. It was filmed from 16 to 18 September 2022. It got 2 million views in the day of its release and became the top video in the Bangladesh's trending category on YouTube.

Punorjonmo 4 
Director Vicky Zahed told Prothom Alo on 27 October 2022 that Punorjonmo 4, the last sequel, will probably come on Eid-ul-Fitr 2023.

Film

Shuklopokkho
On 11 August 2022, Punorjonmo Universe's web thriller film Shuklopokkho was released in Chorki. In this 96-minute web film, three university students go missing. So Manju, the character of the film, starts worrying about his lover Laboni.

Cast and characters
 Afran Nisho as chef Rafsan Haque
 Imam Hossain Saju as Raju, a voice
 Mehazabien Chowdhury as Nila Haque, Rafsan's wife/Rokeya
 Khairul Basar as Niloy/Manju
 Shahed Ali as Nuru, Rafsan's driver
 Quazi Nawshaba Ahmed as Borsha, Rafsan's younger sister
 Abdullah Al Sentu as Kamal, a serial killer
 Faruque Ahmed as Idris Ali
 Ziaul Roshan as Humayun
 Sunerah Binte Kamal as Laboni
 Sharif Siraj as OC Kamrul

Reception
Punorjonmo 1 and 2 became popular with viewers after their telecast on Channel i. Punorjonmo series uploaded to YouTube are given English subtitles due to response from foreign viewers. According to Channel i officials, both the specials have received a lot of positive reactions. According to Shah Alam Saju of The Daily Star, its TV specials were among the hottest TV works of 2021.

Awards

References

Fictional universes
Bangladeshi television specials
Bangladeshi film series